Jesús Monge Ramírez (November 9, 1910 – August 9, 1964), better known as Chucho Monge, was a Mexican composer best known for writing traditional songs. Born in Morelia, Michoacán, he is the writer of several well-known songs, including "México Lindo y Querido",  "La Feria de las Flores", "Pobre Corazón", and "Cartas Marcadas", among others.

Mongue, started his musical career competing against other composers like Agustín Lara y Alfonso Esparza Oteo, in waltz composition contests. Later on, he became a radio artist in XEQ, XEW and XEB stations.

In partnership with Lucha Reyes, she became an important performer of his songs.

His song "La feria de las flores" was inspiration for a Disney movie that never happened, due to legal reasons.

Cofounder of the powerful "Sociedad de Autores y Compositores de Música de México", (Society of Authors and composers of music of México, still on functions), alongside composers Gonzalo Curiel, Alfonso Esparza Oteo, Tata Nacho.

References

External links

Chucho Monge biography (in Spanish)

1910 births
1964 deaths
Mexican composers
Mexican male composers
People from Morelia
Musicians from Michoacán
Writers from Michoacán
20th-century composers
20th-century male musicians